Cuckooing is a form of action, termed by the police, in which the home of a vulnerable person is taken over by a criminal in order to use it to deal, store or take drugs, facilitate sex work, as a place for them to live, or to financially abuse the tenant. The practice is associated with county lines drug trafficking. 

As of the 2010s, cuckooing was becoming an increasingly common problem in the South of England.

The term cuckooing, with reference to an undesirable trespasser whose purpose is to use the victim's home as a base for county lines drug trafficking in the UK, comes from the cuckoo's practice of taking over other birds' nests for its young. In this context, the term was mentioned in 1992 by Michael E. Buerger, was subsequently overlooked, and then regained wider use from 2010.

Jess Phillips and Iain Duncan Smith are leading calls for cuckooing to be criminalised as part of a review of the 2015 Modern Slavery Act.  North Wales Police told the Centre for Social Justice that between March 2021 and April 2022 they had identified 54 cuckooing victims, 44 were thought to have problems with substance misuse, 10 were disabled or learning disabled, and 39 were unemployed.  Phillips stated  “We must outlaw this exploitation of vulnerable people, threatened and manipulated by drug gangs who take over their home”

References

Further reading
"It can be stopped". Centre for Social Justice, August 2018

Illegal drug trade in the United Kingdom